is a Japanese singer-songwriter. She is also the lead vocalist of Japanese musical duo See-Saw. Many of her songs, both solo and with See-Saw, have been used as theme songs in various anime series. Since 2003, her popularity abroad as part of See-Saw and as a solo artist has risen significantly. She made an appearance at Anime Expo 2007 as a Guest of Honor. She has also performed at Animelo Summer Live in 2006, 2008, 2009, 2010, 2011, and 2012 including collaborations with Chihiro Yonekura in 2008, Angela in 2009 and Minori Chihara in 2012, and being one of the artists in the Animelo Summer Live theme song singles in 2006, 2008, 2009 and 2010. She has also been a guest performer at the C3 anime convention in Hong Kong.

In 2012 Chiaki Ishikawa held two solo live concerts in each of Osaka and Tokyo, the latter held at Garden, Shimo-kitazawa.

In July 2012 Chiaki Ishikawa performed at the Firefly anime festival in Guangzhou, China.

In January 2013, Chiaki Ishikawa starred in a play  which featured her singing several of her songs.

On May 13, 2013, Chiaki Ishikawa appeared at an in-store live at Tower Records Shinjuku with Natsumi Kon to promote the OP and ED singles from Ginga Kikotai Majestic Prince.

On June 14, 2013, Chiaki Ishikawa held a solo live concert in Shibuya.

in July 2013 Chiaki Ishikawa performed in a concert in Shanghai, China with Maon Kurosaki.

On August 11, 2013, Chiaki Ishikawa performed four songs live at Otakon 2013, opening for Yoko Kanno's PianoMe concert.

On August 29, 2013, Chiaki Ishikawa held a sold-out solo concert in Shibuya O-East, singing 19 songs.

Discography

Maxi Singles

Albums

Other

 Little bird
 Featured in Uninstall single, Bokurano first ending theme
 Vermillion
 Featured in Uninstall single, Bokurano second ending theme
 Rakurui
 Sengoku Basara (anime) insert song
 
 from the album Another Sound Of 009 Re: Cyborg
 Respect Me
 Ginga Kikotai Majestic Prince third ending theme

Songs written for other vocalists

 
 Lyrics and music
 Performed by Hiromi Nagasaku
 
 Lyrics and music
 Jura Tripper OP, Performed by Hironobu Kageyama
 
 Lyrics only
 Performed by Sōichirō Hoshi; Mobile Suit Gundam SEED image song
 "Blast of Wind", 2007
 Lyrics only
 Performed by Saori Kiuji; Kaze no Stigma OP
 
 Lyrics only
 Performed by Kaori Hikita; Hatenko Yugi ED
 
 Lyrics and music to both songs
 Performed by Hiroyuki Yoshino; Mobile Suit Gundam 00 Character CD
 
 Lyrics and music
 Performed by Chihiro Yonekura
 
 Lyrics only
 Performed by hibiku
 
 Lyrics only
 Performed by Minori Chihara
 "Strawberry Pain", 2012
 Lyrics only
 Performed by Manami Numakura
 
 Lyrics only
 Performed by Asuka Ookura, Sakura-sō no Pet na Kanojo ED
 
 Lyrics and music
 Performed by Ayahi Takagaki
 
 Lyrics and music
 Performed by Natsumi Kon, Ginga Kikotai Majestic Prince OP

See-Saw
See See-Saw discography

External links
 Official website 
 Victor Entertainment page 
 
 
 
 Chiaki Ishikawa at vgmdb.net
 Chiakin.net (Unofficial fansite)

References

Japanese women musicians
Anime composers
Japanese women singers
Japanese lyricists
Japanese women composers
Japanese composers
Living people
1969 births
Victor Entertainment artists
Singers from Tokyo
Anime musicians